Gregory Blair (born 15 December 1947) is an Australian former cricketer. He played one first-class cricket match for Tasmania in 1967 and one match for Victoria in 1969.

See also
 List of Victoria first-class cricketers
 List of Tasmanian representative cricketers

References

External links
 

1947 births
Living people
Australian cricketers
Tasmania cricketers
Victoria cricketers
Cricketers from Launceston, Tasmania